Pandurang Vaman Kane (pronounced Kaa-nay) (7 May 1880 – 18 April 1972) was a notable Indologist and Sanskrit scholar. He received India's highest civilian award Bharat Ratna in 1963 for his scholarly work that spanned more than 40 years of active academic research that resulted in 6,500 pages of History of Dharmaśāstra. The historian Ram Sharan Sharma says: "Pandurang Vaman Kane, a great Sanskritist wedded to social reform, continued the earlier tradition of scholarship. His monumental work entitled the "History of the Dharmasastra", published in five volumes in the twentieth century, is an encyclopedia of ancient social laws and customs. This enables us to study the social processes in ancient India."

Early life
He was born in a village called Parasuram near Chiplun in Ratnagiri district of Maharashtra on 7 May 1880 in a Chitpavan Brahmin family

Important works

Dr. Kane is famous for his magnum opus in English, History of Dharmaśāstra (Ancient and Mediæval Religious and Civil Law). This work traced the historical development of legal concepts, principles, and rules in ancient and medieval India through an exhaustive survey of religious and legal texts and other historical sources. It was published in five volumes published between 1930 and 1962; second editions were issued of several volumes, the latest appearing in 1975. The work runs to a total of more than 6,500 pages. Dr. Kane used the resources available at prestigious institutes such as the Asiatic Society of Mumbai and Bhandarkar Oriental Research Institute, among others. The work is known for its expanse and depth – ranging across diverse subjects such as the Mahabharata, the Puranas and Chanakya – including references to previously obscure sources. The richness in the work is attributed to his in-depth knowledge of Sanskrit. His success is believed to be an outcome of his objective study of the texts instead of deifying them.

Kane wrote the book Vyavaharamayukha and was in the process of writing an introductory passage on the History of Dharmaśāstra for this book so that the reader would get an overall idea apart from the subject of the book. One thing led to another and this project snowballed into the major work that it is. All the same, he was categorical in saying that it is difficult to find an English equivalent of the word "Dharma." His output in the form of writings across the three languages of English, Sanskrit and Marathi spans nearly 15,000 pages.

‘History of Poetics’ was one of his other great books. Apart from Theology and Poetry, he wrote a great deal on other topics too, which included Astrology, Cultural and Geographical history of India-Maharashtra-Konkan- Vidarbha, Marathi language, its grammar, language & handwriting, economics of Kautilya (Chanakya), Mathematics, Dramatics, etc. There are in all 198 publications by his name. They include 39 texts, 115 articles, 44 books, introductions and reviews.

Recognition
Dr. Kane was rewarded as Mahamahopadhyaya (Etymology: Maha+Maha+Upadhyay = The greatest among the great teachers), usually shortened to MM as a prefix in the writings that refer to him. He served as the vice-chancellor of the University of Mumbai. His services were requisitioned and enlisted for establishing Kurukshetra University in Indic studies. He was awarded the Sahitya Akademi award in 1956 for History of Dharmaśāstra, vol. IV for his research under the Sanskrit translation category. He was also an honorary member of the Bharatiya Vidya Bhavan.

He was nominated to the Rajya Sabha as a member of Parliament for his distinguished record in the field of academics. The highest accolade bestowed upon him was the Bharat Ratna in 1963.

The Asiatic Society of Mumbai sponsored a stamp in his honour, which was released by the Governor of Maharashtra on 18th April 2022.

Indian law
Kane believed that the Constitution of India made a complete break with the traditional ideas prevalent in India by engendering a false notion among the people that they have rights but no obligations.

Given the encyclopaedic and authoritative nature of his work, it is often used in debates in Polity. One such issue that cropped up during Atal Bihari Vajpayee government was whether ancient Indians ate beef and both the groups quoted extensively from Kane's work to support their viewpoint. This issue became important as Hindus traditionally revere the cow as a mother and hence eating of beef is prohibited. Another such issue was whether the girls in the ancient times had the right to wear the yajnopavita (sacred thread), as the upanayana ceremony was restricted only to the men in the recent past.

Legacy
To commemorate him, the Asiatic Society of Mumbai has established the Mm. Dr. P.V. Kane Institute for Post Graduate studies and Research in 1974 to promote, encourage and facilitate research in oriental studies. Also, MM Dr. P.V. Kane Gold Medal is given once every three years to a scholar for outstanding contribution to the study of Vedic, Dharmashastra or Alankara Literature.

See also
 Dharmasastra
 Dharma

References

Other sources
 S.G. Moghe (editor), Professor Kane's contribution to Dharmasastra literature, 1997, New Delhi: D.K. Printworld (P) Ltd. 
 Autobiographical Epilogue in History of Dharmashastra Vol 5

External links

 
 Rare letters and correspondences of P.V. Kane
 A write-up on MM Dr. P.V. Kane
 Publication dates of volumes
 Sahitya Akademi Award
 Honorary member of Bharatiya Vidya Bhavan
 Evolution of MM Dr. P.V. Kane’s Magnum Opus
 Constitution making a complete break with traditional ideas of India
 Biography (Chapter 2.2) (German site, biography in English)
 Kane's chronology of Dharmasastra literature (At the bottom of the article) (German site, chronology in English)
 P V Kane  – Notes for the  biography – Padmakar Dadegaonkar
 भारतरत्न, महामहोपाध्याय डॉ.पा.वा.काणे  

Kane, PV
Kane, PV
Recipients of the Sahitya Akademi Award in Sanskrit
Kane, PV
Marathi-language writers
Kane, PV
Kane, PV
Kane, PV
Kane, P.V.
Indian Sanskrit scholars
People from Ratnagiri district
Marathi people
Nominated members of the Rajya Sabha
20th-century Indian educators
20th-century Indian historians